The third season of the American television drama series Empire premiered on September 21, 2016, in the United States on Fox. The third season was ordered on January 15, 2016. The show is produced by 20th Century Fox Television, in association with Imagine Entertainment, Lee Daniels Entertainment, Danny Strong Productions and Little Chicken Inc. The showrunners for this season are Ilene Chaiken, Danny Strong and Lee Daniels. The season aired on Wednesday at 9:00 pm, the same slot as the previous seasons. The season concluded on May 24, 2017 and consisted of 18 episodes.

Premise 
The show centers around a hip hop music and entertainment company, Empire Entertainment, and the drama among the members of the founders' family as they fight for control of the company.

Cast and characters

Main cast
 Terrence Howard as Lucious Lyon
 Taraji P. Henson as Cookie Lyon
 Bryshere Y. Gray as Hakeem Lyon
 Jussie Smollett as Jamal Lyon
 Trai Byers as Andre Lyon
 Grace Byers as Anika Lyon
 Gabourey Sidibe as Becky Williams
 Ta'Rhonda Jones as Porsha Taylor
 Serayah as Tiana Brown
 Morocco Omari as Tariq Cousins
 Xzibit as Shyne Johnson
 Bre-Z as Freda Gatz

Recurring cast
 Kaitlin Doubleday as Rhonda Lyon 
 Leslie Uggams as Leah Walker
 Tasha Smith as Carol Holloway
 Vivica A. Fox as Candace Holloway
 Sierra A. McClain as Nessa Parker
 Ajiona Alexus as Young Cookie
 Jeremy Carver as Young Lucious
 Taye Diggs as Angelo DuBois 
 Andre Royo as Thirsty Rawlings
 Samuel Hunt as Xavier Rosen
 Romeo Miller as Gram
 Phylicia Rashad as Diana DuBois
 Ezri Walker as Zeah
 Juan Antonio as Phillip
 Tobias Truvillion as D-Major
 Nia Long as Giuliana Green
 Demi Moore as Nurse Claudia 
 Veronika Bozeman as Veronica
 Mike Moh as Steve Cho
 Claudette Burchett as Juanita

Guest cast
 French Montana as Vaughn
 Birdman as himself
 Mariah Carey as Kitty
 Eva Longoria as Charlotte Frost
 Sticky Fingaz as Brick
 Remy Ma as herself
 Rumer Willis as Tory Ash
 Estelle as Delphine
 Tinashe as herself
 Fetty Wap as Trig

Production

Development
Empire was renewed for a third season on January 15, 2016. It was later announced that the season will premiere on September 21, 2016. Fox released a promotional poster on July 14, 2016, for the season, showcasing both Lucious Lyon and Cookie Lyon.

Casting
TVLine announced on June 18, 2016, that Xzibit who plays Shyne Johnson, Lucious’ drug-dealing adversary, was upgraded to a series regular for the third season after being a recurring role in the second season. On July 8, 2016, Entertainment Weekly announced that rapper French Montana will appear in the third-season premiere, playing music mogul Vaughn, a member of Lucious Lyon's powerful inner circle. Birdman will also appear on the show as himself. The Hollywood Reporter announced on July 13, 2016, that Sierra McClain will join the show in a recurring role. She will be playing Nessa, Shyne's loyal protege whom Lucious is eager to sign. In August 2016, it was announced Mariah Carey would appear as Kitty, a superstar who collaborates with Jamal. On August 29, 2016, it was announced that Phylicia Rashad had joined the cast. On November 22, 2016, it was announced Nia Long would appear in a recurring role as Giuliana, a night club owner. On January 30, 2017, it was announced Eva Longoria would guest star. On February 21, 2017, Demi Moore was announced to be joining the cast of the series, making an appearance in the season finale, before recurring in Season 4. In episode 13, Estelle will reprise her season 1 role as Empire recording artist Delphine.

Episodes

Reception

Live + SD ratings

Live + 7 Day (DVR) ratings

References

2016 American television seasons
2017 American television seasons
Empire (2015 TV series) seasons